Senn's Grist Mill-Blacksmith Shop-Orange Crush Bottling Plant is a complex of historic commercial buildings located at Summerton, Clarendon County, South Carolina. The complex consists of three interconnected early-20th century buildings of similar size and construction. The grist mill was built about 1905, is an example of small independent grist mills that were commonplace in rural communities across the South. The blacksmith shop and bottling plant, built about 1921, are typical of early-20th century light industrial buildings. The complex supplied the local agricultural sector with essential goods and services for nearly a century.

It was listed in the National Register of Historic Places in 1994.

References

Blacksmith shops
Bottling plants
Commercial buildings on the National Register of Historic Places in South Carolina
Commercial buildings completed in 1905
Buildings and structures in Clarendon County, South Carolina
National Register of Historic Places in Clarendon County, South Carolina
1905 establishments in South Carolina